Richard D. J. Clarke (born 29 May 1979) is a Northern Irish former footballer who was most recently manager of Dergview. Clarke played as a central midfielder.

Career

Club career
Born in Castlederg, Clarke signed for Portadown in 1994, from amateur side Dungoyne Boys. He has appeared in European competition for Portadown, and won the Northern Ireland Football Writer's Association 'Young Player of the Year' award in 1999.

With Portadown, Clarke has won two leagues competitions and six cups.

Since 2009, Clarke has made over 60 appearances in the IFA for Portadown.

International career
Clarke was a Northern Ireland under-21 international.

In February 2007, Clarke was a squad member for a Northern Ireland representative side which competed against an England representative side.

Management career
Clarke was appointed player-manager of Dergview in June 2013. He resigned in January 2018.

Personal life
Clarke is distantly related to his namesake and fellow footballer Richard Clarke.

Clarke had testicular cancer in 2012.

Honours
Portadown
Irish League - 2001–02
Irish Cup - 1998-99, 2004–05
IFA Championship - 2008–09
Charity Shield - 1999–00
Co-Op Insurance Cup - 2008–09
Ivan Marshall Memorial Cup - 2004–05
Royal Mail Community Action Cup - 2003–04, 2004–05

References

External links
NIFG Profile

1979 births
Living people
People from Castlederg
Association footballers from Northern Ireland
Football managers from Northern Ireland
Portadown F.C. players
Dergview F.C. players
NIFL Premiership players
Association football midfielders